Nyce Farm, also known as the Eshback Farm and Van Gordon House, is a historic home and farm complex located in the Delaware Water Gap National Recreation Area at Lehman Township, Pike County, Pennsylvania.  The farmhouse dated to the early 19th century, and was a large -story, five-bay, clapboard-sided frame dwelling. The original farmhouse, known as the Jacobus Van Gorden House, is a -story, three-bay, rubble sandstone dwelling.  Also on the property are five contributing barn, garage, and storage buildings.

It was added to the National Register of Historic Places in 1979.

References

External links

Houses on the National Register of Historic Places in Pennsylvania
Historic American Buildings Survey in Pennsylvania
Houses in Pike County, Pennsylvania
National Register of Historic Places in Pike County, Pennsylvania